Wright Robinson College is a coeducational secondary school in Abbey Hey, Gorton, Manchester, England.

The college caters to pupils of all socio-economic and religious backgrounds and was previously a specialist college of Sport and the Arts. Wright Robinson holds the Sportsmark Gold award with distinction, Artsmark Gold award also with distinction, the coveted FA Charter Mark, and the Healthy School award. Wright Robinson College is the single largest and most over-subscribed school in the city of Manchester, with around 1,800 pupils on roll. The school converted to academy status in November 2019 and is now sponsored by the Flagship Learning Trust.

The college is named after Wright Robinson, a long-serving Manchester city councillor.

The Headmaster of the college is Martin E. Haworth, with Neville L. Beischer as the CEO and the Chair of Governors is Christine Shaw. The college, in terms of Value Added scores, is the highest achieving Comprehensive secondary school in England and Wales. This means that from a relatively low achieving background, children leave Wright Robinson with above average results. Results from Wright Robinson are higher than those of any school of its kind in the country, beaten in Manchester only by the King David School.

The annual presentational ceremony for GCSE results is held at the Bridgewater Hall, home of the Hallé Orchestra.

Curriculum
Unlike most other schools in the Manchester area, Wright Robinson pupils are allowed to take GCSE exams a year early. This allows for gifted and talented pupils to progress onto A-Level studies one year early. It also allowed pupils who did not achieve well in the early entry exams to re-sit in the next year. However, this stopped in September 2012.

As a result of the school's specialism, sport, throughout the five years that pupils spend at Wright Robinson, the subject is compulsory. Up to five hours of sport per academic week are integrated into the timetable alongside other studies.

All pupils at Wright Robinson leave with a minimum of two GCSE grades A-C in Sport.

New building

In September 2007, the college moved out of the old building and into the new £23m+ building on the adjoining fields. The school was built under the PFI scheme and is the most expensive school or college ever built in Europe. At a total of £53m, the school and grounds are home to some of the finest sporting and educational facilities in the world with some of the sporting facilities including; a 25-metre swimming pool, multiple sports halls, fitness suite, dance studio, weights room and numerous tennis and football pitches.

The school holds a total number of 8 ICT laboratories with an additional learning centre named the Learning Resource Centre (known as the LRC), all with computer facilities. The school also is equipped with a 300+ seat auditorium, an exhibition area, an audio visual suite, Apple Mac suites for the use of media studies classes, electronic registration and monitoring system, a drama studio, music recital rooms, outdoor eating facilities (referred to as "pods"), four separate pupil break areas (quads) and excellent science experimentation facilities.

Reputation
The school has played host to such events as the British U15, U16 and U18 weightlifting championships and played a part in the hosting of the Commonwealth Games of Manchester 2002.

Late in 2007, the school was hailed by the Manchester City Council as being "the single most improved school or college in the United Kingdom".  The college has seen a rise of over 40% in the number of pupils who gain at least 5 A-C grades at GCSE.

Sport
Wright Robinson College has been involved with the 2002 Commonwealth Games weightlifting events.

Since becoming a sports college in 1997, the school has held onto the specialism and has seen a 94% rise in the number of pupils gaining 2 GCSE A-C Grades in Sport.

In 2007, The Times named the school "The best school for sport in the United Kingdom". This was based on a national record that WRC holds for the most number of Junior sporting titles held by a British high school. Various sports teams at the school at the time had achieved 43 national sporting titles, 56 regional titles and 63 county/Manchester Schools titles.

In conjunction with the Manchester Institute of Sport and Physical Activity (MISPA) at the Manchester Metropolitan University and the Youth Sports Trust, Wright Robinson has taken part in a ten-year research project. The project was designed to support the school's strategic aim of raising academic standards and increasing whole school participation in Physical Education and Sport. In ten years over 10,000 children and 1,000,000 hours of PE have been assessed. The evidence shows that participation in physical activity enables young people to significantly improve their physical competence, confidence and self-esteem. More active pupils were also found to generally achieve higher academic attainment with 62% of physically active pupils achieving five or more A*-C GCSE grades including mathematics and English compared to 38% of the least active pupils.

The research project won a Times Educational Supplement Award for Outstanding Sporting Initiative at the 2009 inaugural TES School awards for excellence and teamwork in education. The judges noted, "The good partnership between the school and the university. The university acts as an excellent prefect. The research has provided long-term, serious evidence". They also praised the involvement of disaffected pupils. In the 2013-14 football year, the college failed in all year age groups to qualify past the first round in the English schools cup competitions.

Since 2012 the Manchester Giants basketball team has used Wright Robinson as its home venue.

Equality and diversity
The college accepts pupils from all backgrounds in an area where it is highly mixed.

Pupil leadership
The college, as well as the leadership staff, has a system of pupil prefects and leaders. Every year the school allocates roles to the highest achieving, most punctual and attendant pupils. There is also a Head Boy and Head Girl elected each year.

The prefects, Head Boy and Head Girl are voted for by the staff of the school, including the Head Teacher and senior staff. When elected, the pupils hold the title for one academic year. The heads of school, when elected, then take an active role in representing the school at events and also taking part in the administration of the school through the year that they hold the title. The heads of school and prefects are distinguished by the colour of their school ties. Pupils have been known to wear black ties with the school arms or more recently, bright red ties with the school arms.

As well as pupil prefects, there are also leadership roles earlier on, such as "young leaders" in the lower years who have shown a keen interest and ability in sport. The "young leaders" have access to free sports coaching courses, attendance of sporting events, seminars and lectures, awards and recognition throughout the college.

Rivalry
The college has a long-running rivalry with a number of schools in the area. Since opening in the late 1960s, it has had a rivalry with the neighbouring St Peter's RC High School, and a strong sense of competition between each other. In terms of sport and sporting clubs, the school also has a long-running rivalry with Our Lady's RC High School.

Official opening
In September 2008, the college was officially opened by the First Lord of the Treasury and Prime Minister of the United Kingdom, Mr Gordon Brown. The Prime Minister was accompanied by his wife Sarah whilst in the city of Manchester for the Annual Labour Party Conference at the Manchester Central (Conference Centre). The centre, then known as G-Mex, was also the venue for gymnastics, weightlifting, judo and wrestling during the 2002 Commonwealth Games.

Notable former pupils
 Premier League footballer Nicky Butt
 Jon Butterworth Professor of Particle Physics at University College London
 David "Nobby" Harrison
 Teden Mengi Footballer

References

Secondary schools in Manchester
Academies in Manchester